The 2000 Bash at the Beach was the seventh and final  Bash at the Beach professional wrestling pay-per-view (PPV) event produced by World Championship Wrestling (WCW). It took place on July 9, 2000 from the Ocean Center in Daytona Beach, Florida.

As of 2023, the event is available on the WWE Network.

Event

Scott Steiner was disqualified when he used the Steiner Recliner, which had previously been banned. WCW Commissioner Ernest Miller stripped Steiner of the WCW United States Championship following the match. Vampiro won the Graveyard match when the Demon did not show up to the ring; most of this match was pre-taped before the show at an outdoor location.

Kevin Nash faced Goldberg in the tenth match, in which Scott Hall's WCW contract was on the line (though Hall actually left WCW earlier in the year). After attempting to use the Jackknife Powerbomb on Goldberg, Scott Steiner betrayed Nash by attacking him from behind, turning heel and costing Nash the match. As a result, Scott Hall's contract was torn up by Goldberg, therefore terminated.

Controversy

Prior to the event going on the air, there was a backstage dispute between Hollywood Hogan and head of WCW creative, Vince Russo. Hogan wanted to win the WCW World Heavyweight Championship in his match against Jeff Jarrett and leave the pay-per-view as champion, but Russo wanted to have Jarrett retain it and later lose it to Booker T that same night. Russo told Hogan that he was going to have Jarrett lie down for him to work a real conflict, although Jarrett was not told it was a work. When the bell rang, Jarrett lay down in the middle of the ring while Russo threw the WCW World title belt in the ring and yelled at Hogan from ringside to pin Jarrett. A visibly confused Hogan complied, placing a foot on Jarrett's chest after getting on the microphone and telling Russo, "Is this your idea, Russo? That's why this company is in the damn shape it's in, because of bullshit like this!" After winning and being announced as the new WCW World Heavyweight Champion, Hogan immediately took the WCW World Heavyweight Championship belt. Moments later, Russo returned to the ring, angrily proclaiming this would be the last time fans would ever see "that piece of shit" in a WCW arena ever again. Hogan claims the shoot promo from Russo was cut without his permission (something Russo would have needed, as Hogan had a creative control clause in his contract), and that Hogan became legitimately angry with Russo and had left WCW following. This led to Hogan filing a defamation of character lawsuit against Russo and WCW's parent company, Turner/Time Warner.

Reception
In 2020, Chris of Retro Pro Wrestling gave the event mixed reviews, stating, "Speaking of tremendous effort, that's mostly what WCW had produced here. Not that it was a flawless show. It was more like A+ for effort, C+ for execution. For all the decent wrestling, for all the moments like Booker T winning the title and that incredible Vince Russo promo, there were dumb Graveyard matches, too many run-ins, and David Flair dropping his pants. This, ladies and gentlemen, was the last ever Bash at the Beach show, and for better or worse, the world of professional wrestling would never forget it."

Results

References

Professional wrestling shows in Florida
2000 in Florida
Events in Daytona Beach, Florida
Bash at the Beach
July 2000 events in the United States
2000 World Championship Wrestling pay-per-view events
Professional wrestling controversies